In enzymology, a phosphoenolpyruvate-glycerone phosphotransferase is an enzyme that catalyzes the chemical reaction

phosphoenolpyruvate + glycerone  pyruvate + glycerone phosphate

Thus, the two substrates of this enzyme are phosphoenolpyruvate and glycerone, whereas its two products are pyruvate and glycerone phosphate.

This enzyme belongs to the family of transferases, specifically those transferring phosphorus-containing groups (phosphotransferases) with an alcohol group as acceptor.  The systematic name of this enzyme class is phosphoenolpyruvate:glycerone phosphotransferase.

References

 

EC 2.7.1
Enzymes of unknown structure